WCSK (90.3 FM) is a non-commercial, educational FM radio station in Kingsport, Tennessee, licensed by the Federal Communications Commission to the Kingsport Board of Education.

The radio studio is in Dobyns-Bennett High School. The WCSK radio transmitter is mounted on a tower atop Bays Mountain in Kingsport. It broadcasts at an effective radiated power of 195 watts. In addition to the city of Kingsport, the station's signal is heard in portions of Sullivan, Hawkins, and Washington counties in Tennessee, and in parts of Scott County, Virginia.

External links
, Kingsport City Schools website

CSK